The Story of the Little Mole Who Knew It Was None of His Business or The Story of the Little Mole Who Went in Search of Whodunit (German, "Vom kleinen Maulwurf, der wissen wollte, wer ihm auf den Kopf gemacht hat", literally "About the little mole, that wanted to know, who 'did' [poo-poo] on his head") is a children's book by German children's authors Werner Holzwarth and Wolf Erlbruch. The book was first published by Peter Hammer Verlag in 1989; it was soon translated and became an international success.

Synopsis
A mole who is just emerging from his hole gets pooped on his head by an unidentified animal; he is certain that it doesn't belong to him and sets out on a mission to discover to whom it does belong. The mole comes across a bird, a horse, a hare, a goat, a cow and a pig and they all poop to show what theirs looks like, and finally the mole receives some assistance from some flies who help him identify the pooper: Hans-Heinerich in the German original (Basil in the English translation) the butcher's dog. The mole exacts his revenge by pooping on the dog's head, and returns to his hole happily.

Reception
The book established the reputation of Erlbruch as an illustrator in the Netherlands, where it was deemed a "classic" in 2012 (and adapted for the stage).

References

 or

External links

 The Guardian

Books by Wolf Erlbruch
Books about feces
1989 children's books